Eupithecia incurvaria is a moth in the  family Geometridae. It is found in Afghanistan, northern Pakistan, Jammu & Kashmir, Nepal and India (Sikkim). It is found at altitudes between 1,400 and 3,500 meters.

References

Moths described in 1903
incurvaria
Moths of Asia